Cheshmeh-ye Gav (also Romanized as Cheshmeh-ye Gāv, Chashmeh Gav, and Chashmeh-i-Gav) is a village in Naharjan Rural District, Mud District, Sarbisheh County, South Khorasan Province, Iran. At the 2006 census, its population was 47, in 15 families.

References 

Populated places in Sarbisheh County